The Milkman is a 1950 American comedy film directed by Charles Barton and starring Donald O'Connor, Jimmy Durante and Piper Laurie.

Plot
Roger Bradley is denied a milkman job at his father's company because of his postwar trauma; when he becomes stressed or frustrated, he quacks like a duck. In revenge, Roger secures a job with his father's archrival Breezy Albright at another milk company. Roger becomes very successful and quickly falls in love with the boss's daughter Chris Abbott.

Cast
 Donald O'Connor as Roger Bradley
 Jimmy Durante as Breezy Albright
 Piper Laurie as Chris Abbott
 Joyce Holden as Ginger Burton
 William Conrad as Mike Morrel
 Henry O'Neill as Bradley Sr.
 Paul Harvey as D.A. Abbott
 Jess Barker as John Carter
 Elisabeth Risdon as Mrs. Carter
 Frank Nelson as Mr. Green
 Charles Flynn as Sgt. Larkin
 Garry Owen as Irving
 John Cliff as Joe
 Billy Nelson as Duke (as Bill Nelson)

References

External links
 
 
 

1950 films
Films directed by Charles Barton
Universal Pictures films
1950 comedy films
American comedy films
American black-and-white films
1950s English-language films
1950s American films